Face Off: Game Face is an American reality television game show on the Syfy cable network in which make-up artists compete against one another to create character make-ups such as those found in sci-fi and horror films. Face Off: Game Face is a spin-off  of Syfy's Face Off and is similar in format to Food Network's Chopped. Each episode features four Face Off all-stars who compete head-to-head through three rounds with one artist being eliminated after each challenge until a final winner is chosen and receives . The challenges are reminiscent of the Foundation Challenges - short, makeup focused challenges - that preceded the main challenges in Face Off which were phased out in the later seasons. The show's host, actress McKenzie Westmore is joined by Academy Award-winning makeup artist Ve Neill and Rick Baker as the series judges with a third guest judge that rotates each episode. Special effects makeup artist Glenn Hetrick, and Emmy Award-winning makeup artist Eryn Krueger Mekash have served as guest judges.

Season 1 contestants

Progress

References

External links
 
 

Face Off (TV series)
2010s American reality television series
2017 American television series debuts
Syfy original programming
2017 American television series endings
American television spin-offs
Reality television spin-offs